Quest for Fame is a music video game developed by Virtual Music Entertainment and distributed by IBM.  They were eventually acquired by Namco (who then made the arcade version in 1999) to create karaoke machines.

In 2001, they resurfaced with a web-based subscription product named Music Playground, allowing the user to purchase the instrument tracks for already-owned audio CDs and play along with them. The service failed to attract a sufficient number of users and was finally shut down in August 2003.

The game
Quest for Fame is a simulation adventure game where the player becomes a rock guitarist, working his way up from lonesome bedroom rehearsals to becoming a garage band member, playing clubs and ultimately becoming a rock legend.

The game is based on tunes by Aerosmith and is played by a special device called "V-Pick" that's included in the box. The device is connected to the PC via the parallel port. It contains simple vibration sensing electronics so that the player can simulate playing a guitar by strumming it along a tennis racket, a baseball bat or just the thigh.

Virtual Music also sold a more realistic virtual guitar device that could be connected to the computer's serial port. Additional buttons permitted adjusting the player's guitar volume and feedback effects in the game. Instead of being equipped with full strings, there was only a small part of the guitar with exposed nylon strings or one metal string on the body.

The game contains cartoon-ized artwork consisting of drawn backgrounds with embedded video sequences played by actors.

The game includes a helpful display called the "Rhythm EKG" (short "REKG"), indicating the guitar activity of the currently playing song in the upper half and the player's input in the lower half. If the EKG peaks of both categories are closely matching, the player is playing well.

The rhythm and lead guitar tracks vary in difficulty as the game progresses.

More information
Quest for Fame was the successor to pretty similar earlier games called Born To Rock and Welcome To West Feedback (bundled with the Virtual Guitar). These games included a variety of music instead of primarily Aerosmith tunes.

A very limited game engine was included on a CD-ROM track on Aerosmith's Nine Lives, but it also included drum tracks for the first time in a Virtual Music title. A virtual drumpad input device called "V-Stix" was introduced by the company with the Nine Lives game engine.

1995 video games
Aerosmith
Arcade video games
Guitar video games
Classic Mac OS games
Video games based on musicians
OS/2 games
PlayStation (console) games
Video games developed in the United States
Windows games